Deep Thought was a computer designed to play chess. Deep Thought was initially developed at Carnegie Mellon University and later at IBM.  It was second in the line of chess computers developed by Feng-hsiung Hsu, starting with ChipTest and culminating in Deep Blue. In addition to Hsu, the Deep Thought team included Thomas Anantharaman, Mike Browne, Murray Campbell and Andreas Nowatzyk. Deep Thought became the first computer to beat a grandmaster in a regular tournament game when it beat Bent Larsen in 1988, but was easily defeated in both games of a two-game match with Garry Kasparov in 1989 as well as in a correspondence match with Michael Valvo.

It was named after Deep Thought, a fictional computer in Douglas Adams' series, The Hitchhiker's Guide to the Galaxy. The naming of chess computers has continued in this vein with Deep Blue, Deep Fritz, Deep Junior, etc.

Deep Thought won the North American Computer Chess Championship in 1988 and the World Computer Chess Championship in the year 1989, and its rating, according to the USCF was 2551.  In 1994, Deep Thought 2 won the North American Computer Chess Championship for the fifth time, with its rating estimated at around 2600. It was sponsored by IBM. Some engineers who designed Deep Thought also worked in the design of Deep Thought 2. Its algorithms were quite simple evaluation functions, but it could examine half a billion chess positions per move in tournament games, which is sufficient to reach depth of 10 or 11 moves ahead in complex positions. Despite that, using the technique of singular extensions it could also follow lines of forced moves that reach even further, which is how it once found a checkmate in 18 moves.

See also 
 Computer chess
 Deep Thought, a fictional computer in Douglas Adams's series, The Hitchhiker's Guide to the Galaxy
 ChipTest, the first in the line of chess computers developed by Feng-hsiung Hsu
 Deep Blue, another chess computer co-developed by Feng-hsiung Hsu, being the first computer to win a chess match against the world champion
 HAL

Notes

References

External links

Chess computers
One-of-a-kind computers
Carnegie Mellon University
IBM computers